David Hugh Alexander Hannay, Baron Hannay of Chiswick  (born 28 September 1935) is a British diplomat.

Biography
Hannay was born in London and educated at Craigflower Preparatory School, Winchester College and New College, Oxford. He entered the Foreign and Commonwealth Office in 1959, and was initially posted to positions in Tehran and Kabul.
Starting in 1965 and continuing into the early 1970s, he was a representative of the British government in discussions which led to the United Kingdom's entry into the European Economic Community in 1973.

He held various positions at the Foreign Office in London during the 1970s and 1980s. He was a minister at the British Embassy in Washington, DC, in 1984–1985, and was then promoted to ambassador and permanent representative to the European Economic Community from 1985 to 1990. After that posting he spent the next five years as ambassador and permanent representative to the United Nations.

Hannay took on specialised roles such as United Nations Special Representative for Cyprus between 1996 and 2003 and was a member of the UN High Level Panel on Threats, Challenges and Change, reporting to the Secretary-General in December 2004.

Honours and awards

In 1981 he was appointed a Companion of the Order of St Michael and St George (CMG), in 1986 a Knight Commander (KCMG) and in 1995 a Knight Grand Cross (GCMG).

On 19 June 2001 he was created a life peer as Baron Hannay of Chiswick, of Bedford Park in the London Borough of Ealing, sitting as a crossbencher.

He was pro-Chancellor of the University of Birmingham from 2001 to 2006.

In 2003 he was made a Companion of Honour.

Lord Hannay was awarded the honorary degree of Doctor of Letters by Birmingham University in 2003.

Other

He chaired the Board of United Nations Association UK from January 2006 to January 2011 and is now chair of the UN All-Party Parliamentary Group.  He is currently a member of the Top Level Group for Nuclear Disarmament and Non-proliferation and a member of the Lords International Relations Committee.

Family

David Hannay was married to Gillian Hannay who died in 2015. He has four sons (Richard, Philip, Jonathan and Alexander) and twelve grandchildren (Peter, Charlotte, Juliette, Edward, Robin, Manon, Harry, Gustavo, Sophie, Julian, Albert and Theodore).

Arms

Publications
 Cyprus: The Search for a Solution. London: I.B.Tauris, 2005. 
 Britain's Quest for a Role: A Diplomatic Memoir from Europe to the UN. London: I. B. Tauris, 2013. 
 New World Disorder: The UN after the Cold War - An Insider's View. London: I. B. Tauris, 2008.

References

External links

Biography from the Birmingham University website
Biography from the UK Parliament website
Lords EU Select Committee on the UK Parliament website
UNA-UK Biography on the UNA-UK website
Interview with Lord Hannay of Chiswick & transcript, British Diplomatic Oral History Programme, Churchill College, Cambridge, 1999

People's peers
Crossbench life peers
Diplomatic peers
1935 births
Living people
People educated at Craigflower Preparatory School
People educated at Winchester College
Alumni of New College, Oxford
Fellows of New College, Oxford
Permanent Representatives of the United Kingdom to the United Nations
Members of the Order of the Companions of Honour
Knights Grand Cross of the Order of St Michael and St George
Permanent Representatives of the United Kingdom to the European Union
Pro-Chancellors of the University of Birmingham
Life peers created by Elizabeth II